Nikos Veliotis (born 26 February 1970 in Athens, Greece) is a Greek musician, composer and cellist.

Biography 
Nikos Veliotis initially studied classical piano until the age of 16. He
became involved in the Athens underground electronic
music scene and founded In Trance 95 together with
Alex Machairas in 1988. He took up the cello at the age
of 21. By the end of the 90s he was totally devoted to
the experimental field in both sound and image,
performing solo or in regular groups. During the early 2000s he started a collaboration with fellow Greek
musician Giannis Aggelakas with whom they released
two albums to date. 

In 2008 he founded Mohammad
(also going by the MMMD moniker) together with ILIOS Coti K. On 21 March 2009 he turned his cello into powder during a live performance with the title ‘Cello Powder [The Complete Works for Cello]’ at the Install
Festival in Glasgow, U.K.  He is the owner of a curved bow (BACH.Bogen n° 19).  He has composed music for dance, theatre and films.  From 2000 to 2007 Veliotis organised the 2:13 festival of experimental music in Athens, Greece.

Selected discography

Solo
β (2001), Confront Recordings
Radial (2004), Confront Recordings
Folklor Invalid (2013), Antifrost With Giannis Aggelakas

Collaborations
28/04/2001 (2001), absurd, with Costis Drygianakis
VW (2002), absurd, with Dan Warburton
Quartet (2004), Hibari Music, with Taku Sugimoto, Kazushige Kinoshita, Taku Unami
The Harmless Dust (2005), Vectors, Headz, with David Grubbs
Οι Ανάσες Των Λύκων (2005), Alltogethernow, EMI
Πότε Θα Φτάσουμε Εδώ (2007), Alltogethernow, EMI
Slugabed (2010), Hibari Music, with Klaus Filip
Caspian Black (2015), Alt.Vinyl, with Xavier Charles

Groups
In Trance 95 (with Alex Machairas)
Cranc (with Rhodri Davies & Angharad Davies)
Looper (with Ingar Zach & Martin Kuchen)
MMMD / Mohammad (with ILIOS & Coti K.) / MMMD (with ILIOS)

Compositions

V (2002) based on violin & cello recordings
qpdbqp (2002) for 6 musicians (piano, saxophone, clarinet, harp, cello & electronics)
aceghd (2004) for string quartet (violin, cello, guitar & contra guitar)
FULL (2003) for cello overdubs
Mugs on Speed (2008) for 9 Mugs on Marble
4D for (2008) 0 ensemble

Compositions for Cello with Curved Bow

Haris Kittos - ÁTROPO  2002
Reynaldo Young - earlier person under the train 2002
Dimitris Kamarotos - 85:03:03 2002
Michalis Adamis - ANELIGMA 2002
Daryl Runswick - SONATA ('Gracing') 2002
Dai Fujikura - Secret Breath 2001

Intermedia 

Vomvos 2003, for cello and video

Cello Powder [The Complete Works for Cello] 2009, multimedia performance for pre-recorded cello, video and live action

References

External links
 Official website
 

Living people
Greek composers
1970 births
Greek cellists